Jaakko Eino Kalevi (born 1984) is a Finnish musician.

Kalevi grew up in Jyväskylä. He started to release music in 2007. Kalevi used to work as a tram driver in Helsinki, Finland.

In 2015, he released Jaakko Eino Kalevi on Weird World. The album was shortlisted for the sixth Nordic Music Prize.

References

Finnish electronic musicians
1984 births
Living people